Bahuarwa is a village development committee in Dhanusa District in the Janakpur Zone of south-eastern Nepal. At the time of the 2014 Nepal census it had a population of 10235 and had 1024 houses.

References

External links
UN map of the municipalities of Dhanusa District

Populated places in Dhanusha District